is a former Japanese football player.

Playing career
Takeda was born in Shizuoka Prefecture on July 13, 1978. After graduating from University of Tsukuba, he joined J2 League club Albirex Niigata in 2001. On October 28, he debuted as right side-back against Sagan Tosu. However he could only play this match and he left the club end of 2001 season.

Club statistics

References

External links

1978 births
Living people
University of Tsukuba alumni
Association football people from Shizuoka Prefecture
Japanese footballers
J2 League players
Albirex Niigata players
Association football defenders